Chitty Chitty Bang Bang is the vintage racing car which is featured in the book, musical film and stage production of the same name. Writer Ian Fleming took his inspiration for the car from a series of aero-engined racing cars built by Count Louis Zborowski in the early 1920s, christened Chitty Bang Bang. The original Chitty Bang Bang's engine was from a Zeppelin dirigible. The name reputedly derived either from the sound it made whilst idling, or from a bawdy song from World WarI.

Six versions of the car were built for the film and several replicas have subsequently been produced. The version built for the stage production holds the record for the most expensive stage prop ever used.

Novel and inspiration

According to Fleming, the original Chitty Bang-Bang was built in 1920; it used a pre-War Mercedes chassis with a six-cylinder Maybach military aeronautical engine that was typically fitted to Zeppelins.

In the novel, the car is described as "a twelve-cylinder, eight-litre supercharged Paragon Panther. They only made one of them and then the firm went broke." At the time the Pott family purchased it, the car was a long, low four-seater in wrecked condition, lacking a bonnet and with British racing green paint peeling off in strips. After purchasing the derelict racer, the children excitedly note the old registration tag, "GEN 11", could be construed as "genii", referring to the powerful magical servants. Caractacus Pott restored the car over a period of three months, and noted "certain modifications, certain changes, had, so to speak, taken place all by themselves during the night, when I wasn't there. Certain – what shall I say? – rather revolutionary and extraordinary adaptations" which turn out to allow her to fly (as a flying car) when stuck in traffic, and allow her to float (as a hovercraft) when the family is stranded on a sandbar by the rising tide.

Film cars

For the 1968 film, at least eight cars were created, with two built as the Paragon Panther prior to its crash:

Only the original road-going version used the registration GEN 11 legitimately and it was owned by Pierre Picton of Stratford upon Avon. Most of the secondary film cars were fitted with engines after filming was complete and were used to promote the film throughout the world. The original racing variant with the British racing green livery and prominent Number 3 shown winning and crashing during the opening credits montage was converted some time after 2010 into a Chitty replica by Gordon Grant.

One of the original cars appeared in a humorous Public information film (PIF) by the Driver and Vehicle Licensing Agency aimed at British motorists, reminding them to pay their Vehicle excise duty. Ironically, there was criticism as all cars built before 1January 1973, including the Chitty Chitty Bang Bang model, are exempt from vehicle excise duty in the UK. The PIF was a parody of the MGM film.

Chitty Prime (GEN 11)

The primary "Chitty" used to photograph most of the driving sequences in the film is a fully functional road-going car with New Zealand registration GEN 1I (formerly UK registration GEN 11). This car was designed by the film's production designer, Ken Adam, and cartoonist and sculptor Frederick Rowland Emett, built by Alan Mann Racing in Hertfordshire in 1967, fitted with a contemporary Ford 3000 Essex V6 engine and automatic transmission and allocated a genuine UK registration. The wooden body was manufactured by ship builders. They employed Architectural Metal Workers, Leonard and Eric Harrington of Ware to manufacture the external metal components. Actor Dick van Dyke, who drove the car in the film, said that "the car was a little difficult to maneuver, with the turning radius of a battleship". Externally, the roadgoing Chitty prime can be distinguished from the other filming models by the presence of small position lights atop the front fenders to meet motor vehicle standards.

This car was privately owned by Pierre Picton of Stratford-upon-Avon from the early 1970s until May 2011. He made numerous public appearances with the car up until the end of 2010, including stops in Malta (1990) and the city of Norwich in August 2009, to promote the theatre show. Public appearances of the car in 2010 were listed on the GEN 11 official website, with a note that there will be no more as the car was sent to Los Angeles to be auctioned on 22 May 2011. The auction price was expected to reach US$1–2million, but capped at $805,000 (£495,415) with the winning bid submitted by New Zealand film director Sir Peter Jackson, who according to his spokesperson said he would use it as a charity fund-raising vehicle. It was registered in New Zealand as GEN 1I, as the registration GEN 11 had already been issued.

Chitty beta
The second road version, a “slightly smaller car”, only appears in the film for around 1 minute 35 seconds, however fans have noticed that the darker steering wheel used for this car has appeared in a few scenes throughout the film, thus speculating that it was regularly used as a drivable stand in to Chitty prime. Chitty beta can be seen in these notable scenes below: 
 when Lord Scrumptious is driving behind and trying to get past Chitty, just before the railway bridge - this was actually the first scene shot for the film
 the car under the viaduct after Chitty landed in Vulgaria
 the car that was stationary in the village/town of Vulgaria
 the car inside the Baron’s castle - this Chitty was fitted with secondary controls in the floorboards to make it look like the car was driving herself
 the scene where the cast and car descended the staircase on the outside of the Castle

Fans have noted several external differences that distinguish beta from prime:
 the support bars behind the radiator grille are vertical & not horizontal like the other Chitty’s
 the wood of the steering wheel is darker (similar to the trailer Chitty)
 the steering wheel also sits higher
 the metal dashboard has a brushed, matte finish rather than a shiny, polished finish

This car was used to promote the American release of the film. Eventually it was purchased by and displayed at the Cars of the Stars Motor Museum in 2000, where it remained until the Keswick museum closed in 2011. The Cars of the Stars collection was purchased by collector Michael Dezer, where it was displayed in Miami as part of his eponymous collection. Dezer's collection has since moved to Orlando.

This car is now on display at the Stahls Automotive Foundation in New Baltimore, Michigan.

Trailer Chitty (GEM 11)
This engineless Chitty was built for close-ups of the actors while driving; the body was mounted to a trailer and scenes were filmed from cameras on the tow vehicle. It had wings, though they were slightly different than the flying Chitty, and was used for both aerial shots as well as some aquatic scenes, filmed in the Pinewood Studios pool.

In this car, the steering wheel sits higher on the dashboard. In addition, the front position lights are carried at the bottom front edge of each fender.

Pierre Picton purchased the trailer Chitty in the early 1970s and had an engine fitted to it; he also modified the front-left fender to fly up for his circus act. Picton sold the car shortly afterwards, and the car was publicly displayed at the Heathfield Wildlife Park and The Rotunda in Folkestone before being sold in 1980/81 to collector Anthony Bamford, who registered it under GEM 11. Bamford has occasionally shown GEM 11 at the National Motor Museum in Beaulieu, UK.

Flying Chitty
One car was built with wings and fiberglass pieces and filmed for flying scenes. The leading edges of the wings house folding propellers. This car was used for publicity stills to promote the film upon its release in 1968 and features prominently in posters.

The car went through an extensive restoration before being put on temporary display at a Mulch-Production facility in 2018.

Transforming Chitty

A version with primarily aluminium fittings was built for the tidal scenes when Chitty has become stranded before transforming into a boat. It appears on screen for less than a minute, as its appearance was significantly different from Chitty prime; the aluminium was substituted as it was thought the sea and salt air would corrode the brass radiator surround of the primary filming cars. The lighter aluminium car also was hoisted for scenes showing the transformation to flying mode. 

After filming was complete, this car was used to promote the film in Australia. In 1991, it was purchased by and displayed at the Cars of the Stars Motor Museum in Keswick, then sold to Eon Productions in 2000, who used the aluminium Chitty to promote the stage musical. Eon tinted some parts to a brass-like colour to more closely resemble Chitty prime, but the transforming aluminium Chitty retained the original aluminium (silver-coloured) shifter, exhaust, and muffler. As it does not have a MOT certificate of roadworthiness in the U.K., it is not allowed on public roads. In July 2009, the Norwich police barred its use in a parade, as the car was not roadworthy, properly registered or insured.

The transforming aluminium Chitty is on long-term loan from Eon to the National Motor Museum, Beaulieu.

Hovering (boat) Chitty
The hover-car was a shell mounted on a speed boat, and was destroyed after filming. According to Heather Ripley, who played the role of daughter Jemima Potts, the boat was controlled remotely from the helicopter filming the scene; because the steering wheel was only cosmetic, Dick Van Dyke would spin the wheel without affecting their path.

ex-Racer No. 3 restomod (11 GEN)

One of the racing Paragon Panther cars filmed in the opening scenes as Number 3 was acquired by Gordon Grant and reconstructed as a Chitty replica.  Grant previously had built a close replica between 1998 and 2008 using the original plans, which was sold at auction in 2011. The fictional registration 11 GEN was applied to the refurbished ex-racer, which was completed in time to be displayed at the Brooklands Museum in 2014. It was also on a long-term loan to the Glasgow Transport Museum until 2017 to raise funds for Strathcarron Hospice.

ex-Racer 3 can be distinguished from Chitty prime by its ten exposed lug nuts attaching each front wheel; the front wheel lug nuts of Chitty prime have a red cover installed after filming.

Grant went on to purchase and restore Mr Toad's car from the 1996 film The Wind in the Willows. Ex-racer no. 3 is now at Beaulieu Motor Museum, where visitors can experience a ride in the car round the estate or watch the car go by.

Paragon Panther
The Hollywood Cars Museum in Las Vegas has a Paragon Panther race car with a bare-metal finish, as it appears in the opening sequence of race scenes, prior to its crash. It is displayed in partnership with collector Michael Dezer alongside other cars made famous through film appearances and the Liberace Garage, decorated automobiles previously owned by Liberace.

Replica cars

Green Chitty (GEN 22)
There is an MGM-licensed replica in the United Kingdom, built by Tony Green from the original plans for a commercial photography business over a three-year period, starting in 2000. The car is roadworthy and has the registration number GEN 22. The brass lamps are all original period pieces and the brass snake horn came from one of the original Chitty cars. The engine is a 3L V6 Ford with a BorgWarner automatic gearbox.

The vehicle currently resides at the Dundee Museum of Transport.

Pointing Chitty
Another Chitty 'copy' was built by Nick Pointing of the Isle of Wight at the request of his wife Carolyn, a lifelong Chitty Chitty Bang Bang fan who asked him to build her dream car. The car was built on a 1970s Land Rover chassis and engine and was driven  overland to Australia in 2007/8 to raise money for charity.

Grant Chitty (772 YUJ)
A replica Chitty Chitty Bang Bang car built by Gordon Grant made its debut in 2008 at Pinewood Studios and was sold at an auction held on 1 December 2011 at Bonhams at Mercedes Benz World in Weybridge, Surrey, UK, bearing the registration plate WGG 5. The Grant Chitty was started in 1998 and took ten years to complete, using advice, assistance, and original blueprints provided by Peter Lamont, who was the assistant art director for the 1968 film; Denise Exshaw, retired set decorator and widow of Harry Pottle, the art director for the film; Lionel Whitehead, who was the chief mechanic at Alan Mann Racing; and Terry Dan, who had built the original car's wooden bodywork. The wheels were cast from the original car by the original foundry. It is equipped with a Ford V6 and automatic transmission, matching Chitty prime.

The car was later sold to broadcaster Chris Evans after the purchaser found it was too long to fit in his garage. Evans hired Joe Macari to make it road legal in 2012, and it was sold at auction again in 2015. The car, which is now registered as 772 YUJ, has been reported erroneously in several newspapers as the original Chitty prime film car with registration GEN 11.

Rothwell Chitty
Another replica was built and finished in July 2014 by hospital worker and jeweller John Rothwell from Cambridge. It is based on a Reliant Rialto chassis and took approximately 3 years to build in a small garage rented from the local council.  Having a three-wheeler based chassis makes this car unique and also disqualifies it from being a genuine replica.  This version of Chitty was used by a local car insurance company for a promotion campaign and is frequently taken to local car shows where it helps to raise money for Addenbrookes Hospital Charitable Trust.

Garofalo Chitty
A replica car built by retired NYPD police Sergeant, Tony Garofalo, of Long Island, New York, was completed in June 2015 after a 5-year build at a cost of over US$100,000. The car is modelled on the original motion picture car, after Garofalo conducted a personal inspection of two original Chitty Chitty Bang Bang cars. Built on a vintage, road legal, 1914 Overland car, updated with a 1928 Ford Model A engine, the car has automated opening retractable wings and vintage brass adornments. All of the bright work is brass, aluminium, stainless steel and copper to prevent any corrosion. It is reported that over 90% of the car has been fabricated, although the original vintage chassis, drivetrain and rear axle have been retained, with an additional conversion to 12 volts. The car is finely detailed with all of the brass features of the original movie car, including a vintage serpent snake horn from an old Mercedes. Garofalo also owns the original Broadway Stage Production Chitty Chitty Bang Bang car featured in the U.S. Stage tour.

Skinner Chitty
Richard Skinner of Hampshire built another replica car, completed in 2019. Following two years of research, the car was built from original drawings of the film car, using the same Ford V6 engine and various original Edwardian car parts. The wooden body was constructed using the same afrormosia and obeche wood used in the original.

Mccracken Chitty
Keith Mccracken from Northern Ireland,Uk started building his replica in 2010 completing it and making it road legal in 2012.  It was a built as close as possible to the original car being 18ft long, engine is a 3L V6 Ford with a BorgWarner automatic gearbox and period pieces sourced where necessary.The car can be hired for use at events.

Stage production cars

West End (2002)
Another version of the car, built for the British stage production of the story, debuted at The London Palladium in 2002. Built at a cost of £750,000, the car is listed in Guinness World Records as the most expensive stage prop ever. During a 2002 performance before Prince Charles and Camilla Parker Bowles, the prop car collided with a ship when the choreography went awry during a chase scene, bringing the show to a premature end; the audience received complimentary tickets to another performance. It was dismantled after the production ended.

Broadway & US tour (2005)

This prop car is highly detailed and is fully equipped with multiple Stage prop tricks, including computer activated retractable wings and wheels that can tilt for the hovercraft sequence. The car was originally constructed at The Rolling Stock Company of Sarasota, Florida and hydraulics designed and constructed at PRG of New Windsor, New York, under license by Michael Rose and MGM On Stage.

It is distinguished most easily by the hourglass shape behind the front grille and the non-functional front suspension, as the beam axle is attached directly to the frame and not the leaf springs. In addition, the rear seat does not have side doors for access.

In July 2014, Tony Garofalo, who completed a Chitty replica on June 30, 2015, acquired the US National Broadway Touring Chitty Chitty Bang Bang Prop Car, by a sale release made by Big League Productions of New York City. The Broadway prop was put up for auction in 2022.

UK/Ireland tour (2015–17)
The auction also featured additional props from the production, including a vintage motorcycle, Baron Bomburst's car, and the Child Catcher's cage.

Kennedy Center Honors (2002)
At Dick Van Dyke's 2021 Kennedy Center Honors performance tribute, the car used for the televised event was designed and built by Duane Joseph Olson and crew. The car was used in a rendition of the title number, performed by Pentatonix and Broadway actor Aaron Tveit. The prop was originally built for a staging of the musical at the CENTER for Performing Arts at Rhinebeck in 2018. It is a 3:4 scale replica of the car from the film, and features the deployable wings, inflating flotation devices, and downward-folding wheels.  Unlike most replicas, the entire exterior of the car is made of wood. Upon seeing the car himself, Van Dyke himself was quoted saying, "you guys just blew me away. That Chitty is perfect." The car is still owned and managed by Olson.

References

External links
 
 
 
 
 
 
 

Fictional racing cars
Chitty Chitty Bang Bang
Cars designed and produced for films
Flying cars in fiction
Fictional elements introduced in 1964